Tsegi is a populated place situated in Navajo County, Arizona, United States.

References

Populated places in Navajo County, Arizona